Wetlands is a 2017 American crime thriller film written and directed by Emanuele Della Valle and starring Adewale Akinnuoye-Agbaje, Heather Graham, Christopher McDonald, Reyna De Courcy and Jennifer Ehle.  Michael Shamberg served as an executive producer of the film.

Premise
A disgraced Philadelphia police detective attempts to make a new start in Atlantic City with the help of his daughter and new partner.

Cast
 Adewale Akinnuoye-Agbaje as Detective Babel "Babs" Johnson
 Heather Graham as Savannah
 Jennifer Ehle as Kate Sheehan
 Christopher McDonald as Detective Paddy "Red" Sheehan
 Reyna de Courcy as "Surfer Girl"
 Celeste O'Connor as Amy Johnson
 Murphy Guyer as Captain Schmidt
 Rob Morgan as Sergeant Walker
 Jake Weber as Sergeant McCulvey
 Barry Markowitz as "Lollipop"
 Louis Mustillo as Jimmy "Coconuts"
 Tyler Elliot Burke as Alfie
 Sean Ringgold as "Big G"
 Anthony Mackie
 Lauren LaVera as "Buttercup" / Pusher
 Pamela Dunlap as Mrs. Harrington 
 Lynne Wintersteller as The Landlady
 Lou Morey as Kenny
 Peter Jacovini as Lollipop's Thug
 William Jacovini as Lollipop's Thug
 Vincent Riviezzo as Mobster
 Dona Gregorio as Lollipop's Girl
 Dana Kreitz as Stripper
 Justine Denea Cassady as Go-Go Dancer
 Natalie Paige Bentley as Party Girl
 Lillian Cartagena as Call Girl
 Darien Davis as Call Girl
 TJ Martin as Drunk Old Man

Release
The film was released in theaters on September 15, 2017.

Reception
The film has a 40% rating on Rotten Tomatoes.  Peter Sobczynski of RogerEbert.com awarded the film two stars.  Alan Ng of Film Threat gave the film a 2 out of 5.

Dennis Harvey of Variety gave the film a negative review and wrote, "Apparently moviemaking keeps getting easier while writing keeps getting harder — Wetlands being yet another example of a film whose surface technical polish can only do so much to gloss over the coarse, clumsy screenplay that flummoxes its cast."

Frank Scheck of The Hollywood Reporter also gave the film a negative review and wrote, "Stronger on style than substance."

References

External links
 
 

American crime thriller films
2017 crime thriller films
2010s English-language films
2010s American films